Stratis Stratigis (17 August 1933 – 16 February 2023) was a Greek lawyer and politician. A member of New Democracy, she served in the Hellenic Parliament from 1985 to 1989.

Stratigis died in Athens on 16 February 2023, at the age of 89.

References

1933 births
2023 deaths
Greek MPs 1985–1989
New Democracy (Greece) politicians
20th-century Greek women politicians
Women members of the Hellenic Parliament
University of Basel alumni
Alumni of the London School of Economics
Politicians from Athens